Grieg usually refers to the Norwegian composer and pianist Edvard Grieg. It may also refer to:

People
 Grieg (surname)

Enterprises
 Grieg Group, a Norwegian shipping and investment corporation
 Grieg Hall, a concert hall
 Grieg Seafood, an international seafood company
 Griegakademiet, a music conservatory

Other uses
 Grieg (crater), a crater on Mercury

See also
 Greig (disambiguation)